Bill King is a New Hampshire politician.

Early life and education
King was born in Queensbury, New York. After graduating high school, King joined the United States Navy, and served there for four years. There, he was trained to be an aviation electrician's mate.

Career
King worked for General Motors for 35 years as an engineer and in management positions. He is currently semi-retired. On November 3, 2020, King was elected to the New Hampshire House of Representatives where he represents the Hillsborough 23 district. He assumed office on December 2, 2020. He is a Republican.

Personal life
King resides in Milford, New Hampshire. King married in 1985. With his wife, he had four children. In 2016, his wife died of sarcoma.

References

Living people
General Motors people
Republican Party members of the New Hampshire House of Representatives
People from Milford, New Hampshire
People from Queensbury, New York
21st-century American politicians
Year of birth missing (living people)